Frank Hoagland is an American politician, business owner, and retired United States Navy SEAL. He was elected to the Ohio Senate in 2016 to represent the 30th District, and took office in January 2017. He owns Special Tactics and Rescue Training (START) LLC, a security training provider,  based in Mingo Junction, Ohio. He previously served in the United States Navy as a Navy SEAL.

Military and business career
Hoagland graduated from Basic Underwater Demolition/SEAL training BUD/S at Naval Amphibious Base Coronado in 1983. After leaving the navy, he became a military contractor and worked on personal security details. In 2005, he founded Special Tactics and Rescue Training (START) LLC, which provides specialized security services and training to national security, law enforcement, and private entities.

Ohio Senate
Hoagland challenged incumbent state Senator Lou Gentile in the 2016 general election for Ohio's 30th Senate District, which spans ten counties. He was unopposed for the Republican nomination. Hoagland defeated Gentile by a margin of 53%-47% in the November 8, 2016 general election.

Electoral history

References

External links
Campaign website

Living people
United States Navy SEALs personnel
21st-century American politicians
Republican Party Ohio state senators
People from Mingo Junction, Ohio
Year of birth missing (living people)